St. Maries Wildlife Management Area at  is an Idaho wildlife management area in Benewah County south of the town of St. Maries. The WMA is located along the St. Maries River on  that were deeded the Idaho Department of Fish and Game,  leased from the Idaho Department of Lands, and an additional  under cooperative agreement with the U.S. Forest Service and Bureau of Land Management

Elk, moose, black bear, and other wildlife are found in the WMA. Hunting is permitted during hunting season in the WMA, including for upland game species such as ruffed and dusky grouse.

References

Protected areas established in 1941
Protected areas of Benewah County, Idaho
Wildlife management areas of Idaho
1941 establishments in Idaho